Gelechia gammanella is a moth of the family Gelechiidae. It is found on Borneo.

Adults are dark cupreous, the forewings rounded at the tips with a yellow costal triangular spot at three-fourths of the length, emitting a slight streak to the disk. The exterior border is convex and very oblique.

References

Moths described in 1864
Gelechia